Krasny Yar is a rural locality (a selo) in Zaigrayevsky District, Republic of Buryatia, Russia. The population was 30 as of 2010. There is 1 street.

Geography 
Krasny Yar is located 59 km northeast of Zaigrayevo (the district's administrative centre) by road. Angir is the nearest rural locality.

References 

Rural localities in Zaigrayevsky District